Iva Roglić (Serbian Cyrillic: Ива Роглић; born 23 March 1988, in Belgrade, SFR Yugoslavia) is a Serbian female basketball player.

External links
Profile at eurobasket.com

1988 births
Living people
Basketball players from Belgrade
Power forwards (basketball)
Serbian expatriate basketball people in France
Serbian expatriate basketball people in Hungary
Serbian expatriate basketball people in Montenegro
Serbian expatriate basketball people in Germany
Serbian women's basketball players
ŽKK Crvena zvezda players
ŽKK Partizan players